Broadway is a decorative typeface, perhaps the archetypal Art Deco typeface.  The original face was designed by Morris Fuller Benton in 1927 for ATF as a capitals only display face.  It had a long initial run of popularity, before being discontinued by ATF in 1954.  It was re-discovered in the Cold Type Era and has ever since been used to evoke the feeling of the twenties and thirties.  Several variants were made:

 Broadway (1928, Morris Fuller Benton, ATF), capitals only.
 Broadway Engraved (1928, Sol Hess, Monotype). 
 Broadway (with lowercase) (1929, Hess, Monotype). 
 Broadway Condensed (1929, Benton, ATF).

Digital Copies

Digital versions are now made by Linotype, Elsner+Flake, Monotype, Bitstream, and URW++. Similar fonts, such as ITC Manhattan and Glitzy are sold by ITC and Ingrimayne Type respectively.

References

Display typefaces
American Type Founders typefaces
Letterpress typefaces
Photocomposition typefaces
Digital typefaces
Typefaces and fonts introduced in 1928
Typefaces designed by Morris Fuller Benton